Daniel Bergner is an American writer. He is a writer at The New York Times Magazine.

He has interviewed Ryan Speedo Green. His work appeared in Slate.

Works 
 God of the Rodeo, Crown Publishers, New York, 1998.  
 In the Land of Magic Soldiers, Farrar, Straus and Giroux, New York, 2003.  
 The Other Side of Desire, Ecco, New York, 2008.  
 What Do Women Want?, Ecco, 2013. 
 Sing For Your Life, Little, Brown and Company, New York, 2016. 
 The Mind and the Moon, Ecco, New York, NY, 2022

References 

The New York Times writers

Living people

Year of birth missing (living people)